YK Pao School is a bilingual (Chinese/English) school located in Shanghai, China.  The school was founded in memory of Sir Yue-Kong Pao.

Overview
Pao School is an international Chinese school that enrolls both local and international students. Pao School uses an enhanced version of the Shanghai Curriculum integrated with international curricula, while its Secondary Division offers boarding education modeled on leading British and American schools.

The core values of YK Pao school are compassion, integrity and balance.

History

About Pao Yue-kong (The founder) 
Sir YK Pao started his shipping business in the 1950s. His clam business style earned him the title of "King of the sea." After achieving huge success in his business, Sir YK Pao put his energy into cultivating talents.

About YK Pao school 
YK Pao School was founded in 2007, officially establishing itself within the campus of Shanghai No. 3 Girl's High School, and eventually opening its own Primary Division campus on West Wuding Road. The Secondary Division campus in Songjiang was opened in 2011, marking the beginning of boarding education at YK Pao School. The school currently has over 1000 Chinese and overseas students, as well as a team of international and Chinese faculty and staff.

Academics 
YK Pao school is a bilingual school that enroll both Chinese and foreign students.  It offers boarding, but accepts day students too.

For primary and middle school's students, YK Pao offers 'Shanghai Plus' courses, giving students an approach to Shanghai curriculum.

For high school students, YK Pao offers Shanghai Plus courses (Y9), IGCSE (Y10), and IB Diploma (Y11–Y12).

Achievements 
Huren Education ranked YK Pao school 1st in the top international schools in China.

Kinglead Group ranked YK Pao 38th in the Chinese international school for its competitiveness of American admission, and 29th of the Britain admission.

Founders 
YK Pao School was founded by Professor Anna Sohmen Pao, who is the eldest daughter of Sir YK Pao, along with Madam Tan Fuyun and Mr. Philip Sohmen.

Notes

External links 
 YK Pao School
 YK Pao School 
 Dragon School, Oxford

Bilingual schools
International schools in Shanghai
Round Square schools
Changning District